Mamadou Niang Ndieye (born January 1, 1994) is a Senegalese professional basketball player for Covirán Granada of the Spanish Liga ACB.

Professional career
On April 30, 2017, Niang won the Basketball Champions League with Tenerife.

On July 19, 2019, Niang signed a three-year deal with Coosur Real Betis.

On August 21, 2022, he signed with Covirán Granada of the Spanish Liga ACB.

References

External links
 Mamadou Niang at RealGM

1994 births
Living people
CB Canarias players
Centers (basketball)
Fundación CB Granada players
Liga ACB players
Sportspeople from Thiès
Real Betis Baloncesto players
Senegalese expatriate basketball people in Spain
Senegalese men's basketball players
UB La Palma players